The Mwadingusha Hydroelectric Power Station, also Mwadingusha Power Station is a 78.3 megawatts hydroelectric power station across the Lufira River in the Democratic Republic of the Congo. Originally commercially commissioned in 1930, the six electricity generators were replaced and upgraded from 11.8 MW each, to 13.05 MW each, raising generation capacity from 71 MW to 78.3 MW.

The rehabilitation and upgrade of the power station between 2016 and 2021, was executed by a joint partnership between Ivanhoe Mines, a Canadian mining company and Société Nationale d'Électricité (SNEL), the DR Congolese national electricity utility parastatal company.

Part of the electricity generated here is used by Ivanhoe Mines in its Kamoa-Kakula Copper Mine, an estimated , southwest of the Mwadingusha HPP. The balance of the power is taken up by SNEL and integrated into the national electricity grid.

Location
The power station lies across the Lufira River, in the town of Mwadingusha, Kambove Territory, Haut-Katanga Province, in the extreme southeastern part of the Democratic Republic of the Congo.

History
As far back as 2016, SNEL in partnership with Ivanhoe Mines, began updating the Mwadingusha HPP, which was first commissioned in 1930 and had not had an upgrade since. The original design included six generators, each rated at 11.8 MW, for total capacity of 71 megawatts. In the beginning, one generator at a time, was repaired and updated.

The supplier of the original electrical mechanical installations was Charmilles of Switzerland. Under the rehabilitation contact in the 21st century, the engineering, procurement and construction (EPC) contract was awarded to a consortium comprising Andritz AG of Austria and Cegelec of France. Cegelec is a subsidiary of Vinci Energies.      

Originally only four of the six electricity generating turbines were targeted for refurbishment. New Francis turbines, each with generating capacity of 13.05 MW, were designed and manufactured in Europe. The work also involved replacing most of the electro-mechanical hardware of the power station, including valves, inverters, voltage regulators, exciters, stabilizers and related equipment.

As the work progressed, in 2017, a decision was made to replace all six generators with new ones. Over time, the scope of work expanded until September 2021, when all six refurbished turbines were fully simultaneously synchronized with the SNEL grid.

See also

 List of power stations in the Democratic Republic of the Congo
 Katende Hydroelectric Power Station

References

External links
 Mwadingusha HPP, Democratic Republic of the Congo As of 15 January 2022.

Haut-Katanga Province
Energy infrastructure completed in 1930
Hydroelectricity in the Democratic Republic of the Congo
Dams in the Democratic Republic of the Congo
Hydroelectric power stations in the Democratic Republic of the Congo